Ivan Nikolayevich Butaliy (born 8 July 1952) is a Russian professional football coach and a former player. He manages FC Progress Timashevsk.

His son Dmitri Butaliy played football professionally.

External links
 

1952 births
Living people
People from Dinskoy District
Soviet footballers
FC KAMAZ Naberezhnye Chelny players
Russian football managers
FC KAMAZ Naberezhnye Chelny managers
Russian Premier League managers
Association football midfielders
Sportspeople from Krasnodar Krai